The women's high jump at the 2011 World Youth Championships in Athletics was held at the Stadium Nord Lille Métropole on 6 & 8 July.

Medalists

Results

Qualifications 
Qualification rule: qualification standard 1.80 m or at least best 12 qualified.

Group A

Group B

Final

References 

2011 World Youth Championships in Athletics